James Orville "Click" Clark (August 2, 1910 - November 17, 1971) was an American lawyer and Democratic politician. He served in the Mississippi House of Representatives and Mississippi Senate.

Biography 
James Orville Clark was born on August 2, 1910, in Belmont, Mississippi. He was a lawyer. He represented Tishomingo County in the Mississippi House of Representatives from 1940 to 1944. He then served in the Mississippi State Senate, representing the 37th District, from 1948 to 1956. At the start of the 1952 session, Clark was elected to be the senate's president pro tempore for the 1952-1956 term. In 1955, Clark unsuccessfully ran for the Democratic nomination for the office of lieutenant governor of Mississippi. On the night of November 17, 1971, Clark and three others were killed in a twin-engine airplane crash near Iuka, Mississippi.

References

1910 births
1971 deaths
People from Iuka, Mississippi
Democratic Party Mississippi state senators
Democratic Party members of the Mississippi House of Representatives
Mississippi lawyers
Victims of aviation accidents or incidents in the United States
Presidents pro tempore of the Mississippi State Senate